Rebecca Rose Lobo-Rushin (born October 6, 1973) is an American television basketball analyst and former women's basketball player in the Women's National Basketball Association (WNBA) from 1997 to 2003. Lobo, at 6'4", played the center position for much of her career. Lobo played college basketball at the University of Connecticut, where she was a member of the team that won the 1995 national championship, going 35–0 on the season in the process. Lobo was inducted into the Women's Basketball Hall of Fame in 2010.  In April 2017, she was announced as one of the members of the 2017 class of the Naismith Memorial Basketball Hall of Fame, alongside Tracy McGrady and Muffet McGraw.

Early life and high school career
Lobo was born in Hartford, Connecticut, the youngest daughter of RuthAnn (née McLaughlin) and Dennis Joseph Lobo. Her father is of Cuban descent, while her mother was of German and Irish heritage. Lobo was raised a Catholic. Her brother Jason played basketball at Dartmouth College and her sister Rachel played basketball at Salem State College. Lobo's mother and father were both teachers; in addition, her father coached both basketball and track and field. Raised in Southwick, Massachusetts, Lobo was the state scoring record-holder with 2,740 points in her high school career for Southwick-Tolland Regional High School in Massachusetts. She held this record for 18 years until it was eclipsed by Bilqis Abdul-Qaadir of the new Leadership Charter School in Springfield on January 26, 2009.

Career

College
More than 100 colleges recruited Lobo, but she chose the University of Connecticut due to proximity and her belief in its academic excellence. She helped lead the Huskies to the 1995 National Championship with an undefeated 35–0 record. In her senior year, Lobo was the unanimous national player of the year, winning the 1995 Naismith College Player of the Year award, the Wade Trophy, the AP Player of the Year award, the USBWA Player of the Year award, the Honda Sports Award for basketball, and the WBCA Player of the Year award. Lobo was awarded the prestigious Honda-Broderick Cup for 1994–95, presented to the athlete "most deserving of recognition as the Collegiate Woman Athlete of the Year". She was a member of the inaugural class of inductees to the University of Connecticut women's basketball "Huskies of Honor" recognition program. Lobo was named the 1995 Sportswoman of the Year (in the team category) by the Women's Sports Foundation. Lobo was the first player in the Big East Conference ever to earn first team all American honors for both basketball and academics.

USA Basketball
Lobo was named to the USA U18 team (then called the Junior World Championship Qualifying Team) in 1992. The team competed in Guanajuato, Mexico in August 1992. The team won their first four games, then lost 80–70 to Brazil, finishing with the silver medal for the event, but qualifying for the 1993 world games. Lobo averaged 6.8 points per game during the event.

Lobo continued with the team to the 1993 U19 World Championship (then called the Junior World Championship). The team won five games and lost two, but that left them in seventh place. Lobo averaged 7.7 points per game and recorded six blocks, highest on the team.

In 1995 Lobo passed through tryouts to join the national team, which later became the US team for the 1996 Olympics in Atlanta, GA. Though her minutes on the floor were few, Lobo shared in the gold medal.

WNBA
In 1997, the WNBA was formed and enjoyed its inaugural season, and Lobo was assigned to the New York Liberty during the league's first player allocations on January 22, 1997. The first season the Liberty fell to the Houston Comets in the WNBA Finals. Lobo suffered a setback in 1999, tearing her left anterior cruciate ligament and her meniscus in the first game of the season. In 1999, she was selected to the inaugural WNBA All Star team but could not play because of the injury.  In 2002, she was traded to the Houston Comets in exchange for Houston's second-round selection (26th overall) in the 2002 WNBA draft.  The next season she was traded to the Connecticut Sun, where she retired in 2003. Lobo also played two seasons in the National Women's Basketball league with the Springfield Spirit 2002 through 2003.

Legacy

Awards and honors 
 1994—Kodak First team All-America
 1995—Honda-Broderick Cup
 1995—ESPY Award–Outstanding Female Athlete
 1995—AP Female Athlete of the Year
 1995—NCAA Women's Basketball Player of the Year
 1995—Women's Sports Foundation–Sportswoman of the Year
 1995—Wade Trophy
 1995—Kodak First team All-America
 1995—Honda Sports Award, basketball
 1997—All WNBA Second team
 1997—WNBA Eastern All-Star team
 2010—Women's Basketball Hall of Fame
 2017—Basketball Hall of Fame
 2019—UConn jersey No. 50 retired

Women's Basketball Hall of Fame 
Lobo was inducted into the Women's Basketball Hall of Fame as part of the class of 2010.

At the induction ceremony, Lobo was introduced by her college coach, Geno Auriemma who praised her for her "impact on the court and off the court" as "one of the founders [of the WNBA]", and "as a representative of our university, [and] as a member of the board of trustees".

Career statistics

College

WNBA

Regular season

|-
| style='text-align:left;'|1997
| style='text-align:left;'|New York
| 28 || 28 || 33.5 || .376 || .286 || .610 || 7.3 || 1.9 || 0.9 || 1.8 || 3.1 || 12.4
|-
| style='text-align:left;'|1998
| style='text-align:left;'|New York
| 30 || 30 || 29.2 || .484 || .308 || .710 || 6.9 || 1.5 || 0.6 || 1.1 || 2.2 || 11.7
|-
| style='text-align:left;'|1999
| style='text-align:left;'|New York
| 1 || 1 || 1.0 ||  ||  ||  || 1.0 || 0.0 || 0.0 || 0.0 || 1.0 || 0.0
|-
| style='text-align:left;'|2001
| style='text-align:left;'|New York
| 16 || 0 || 5.3 || .318 || .500 || .500 || 0.9 || 0.1 || 0.1 || 0.0 || 0.4 || 1.1
|-
| style='text-align:left;'|2002
| style='text-align:left;'|Houston
| 21 || 0 || 6.3 || .469 || .429 || .250 || 1.1 || 0.6 || 0.1 || 0.2 || 0.5 || 1.6
|-
| style='text-align:left;'|2003
| style='text-align:left;'|Connecticut
| 25 || 13 || 11.9 || .284 || .250 || .222 || 2.1 || 0.2 || 0.2 || 0.6 || 0.6 || 2.4
|-
| style='text-align:left;'|Career
| style='text-align:left;'|6 years, 3 teams
| 121 || 72 || 19.2 || .407 || .295 || .628 || 4.1 || 1.0 || 0.4 || 0.9 || 1.6 || 6.7

Playoffs

|-
| style='text-align:left;'|1997
| style='text-align:left;'|New York
| 2 || 2 || 34.0 || .429 || .000 || .583 || 9.0 || 2.0 || 0.0 || 2.0 || 2.5 || 12.5
|-
| style='text-align:left;'|2003
| style='text-align:left;'|Connecticut
| 2 || 1 || 19.0 || .400 || .250 || .000 || 4.0 || 2.5 || 0.0 || 2.0 || 1.0 || 4.5
|-
| style='text-align:left;'|Career
| style='text-align:left;'|2 years, 2 teams
| 4 || 3 || 26.5 || .419 || .143 || .583 || 6.5 || 2.3 || 0.0 || 2.0 || 1.8 || 8.5

Broadcast career 
Today, Lobo is a reporter and color analyst for ESPN with a focus on women's college basketball and WNBA games.

Breast cancer advocate and health spokesperson 
In 1996, Lobo and her late mother, Ruth Ann Lobo, collaborated on a book entitled The Home Team, which dealt with Ruth Ann's battle with breast cancer.  They also founded the RuthAnn and Rebecca Lobo Scholarship, which offers a scholarship to the UConn School of Allied Health for Hispanic students. Lobo was the 1996 spokesperson for the Lee National Denim Day fund raiser which raises millions of dollars for breast cancer research and education.

Starting in 2000, Lobo served as national spokesperson and backer for Body1.com, a consumer-targeted network of sites providing interactive content-rich information on medical technologies that treat ailments and diseases specific to body parts. Due to her recurring problems with a torn anterior cruciate ligament, (ACL), she campaigned to raise awareness of knee injury risks in women. Lobo shared her story with others suffering from the same type of injury and strongly advocated for patient self-education via the Internet.

Personal life 
On April 12, 2003, Lobo changed her last name to Lobo-Rushin after marrying Sports Illustrated  writer Steve Rushin at the Basketball Hall of Fame in Springfield, Massachusetts.  They have four children (three daughters and one son).

Ball & Chain Podcast 
Lobo and Rushin host a weekly podcast called the Ball & Chain Podcast. They discuss current events, sports and family life. They published the first episode on October 23, 2017.

See also 
 List of Connecticut Huskies women's basketball players with 1000 points
 List of Connecticut Huskies women's basketball players with 1000 rebounds

Notes

References
 Career information and statistics from Basketball-Reference.com

External links
 Rebecca Lobo's blog

1973 births
Living people
All-American college women's basketball players
American people of German descent
American people of Irish descent
American people of Polish descent
American women's basketball players
American sportspeople of Cuban descent
Basketball players at the 1996 Summer Olympics
Basketball players from Hartford, Connecticut
Basketball players from Massachusetts
Centers (basketball)
Connecticut Sun players
Houston Comets players
Medalists at the 1996 Summer Olympics
Naismith Memorial Basketball Hall of Fame inductees
National Basketball Association broadcasters
New York Liberty players
Olympic gold medalists for the United States in basketball
Parade High School All-Americans (girls' basketball)
People from Southwick, Massachusetts
Sportspeople from Hartford, Connecticut
UConn Huskies women's basketball players
United States women's national basketball team players
Women's college basketball announcers in the United States
Women's National Basketball Association All-Stars
Women's National Basketball Association announcers
Women sports announcers